Udal is a surname. Notable people with this surname include:

Geoffrey Udal (1908–1980), English cricketer
John Udal (1848–1925), English cricketer, antiquarian, author
Robin Udal (1883–1964), English cricketer and colonial administrator
Shaun Udal (born 1969), English cricketer

See also
Udall (disambiguation)